Need love is the fourth studio album by Japanese pop band Deen. It was released on 24 May 2000 under Berg label records. It is their first self-produced album. The album consists of three previously released singles, "Just One", "My Love" and "Power of Love". Just one has received album version under title "-Break 4 Style-"

This is the last album where Naoki Uzumoto is providing music for them. In 1999, after the release of single My love he left the band.

From this album, their music style slowly start change from original rock style to more mainstream pop sphere.

The album reached #10 in its first week and charted for 4 weeks, selling 58,940 copies. This is their last album which entered into Oricon Top 10 rankings.

Track listing

In media
Aoi Senshi Tachi - commercial song for company NTT DoCoMo Shikoku
Just One - commercial song for company "Sharp Corporation'My Love - theme song for Fuji TV drama Kaze no YukuePower of Love - ending theme for Nihon TV program Sports Max''

References

Sony Music albums
Japanese-language albums
2000 albums
Deen (band) albums